A train wreck, train collision, train accident or train crash is a type of disaster involving one or more trains. Train wrecks often occur as a result of miscommunication, as when a moving train meets another train on the same track; or an accident, such as when a train wheel jumps off a track in a derailment; or when a boiler explosion occurs. Train wrecks have often been widely covered in popular media and in folklore.

A head-on collision between two trains is colloquially called a "cornfield meet" in the United States.

Train wreck gallery

See also 

 Lists of rail accidents
 List of accidents and disasters by death toll
 Classification of railway accidents
 Bridge disaster
 Level crossing crashes
 Runaway
 Signal passed at danger
 Tram accident
 Wrong-side failure
 The crash at Crush, Texas, an intentional train wreck conducted as a publicity stunt
 Railway accident deaths

References

Further reading 
 Aldrich, Mark. Death Rode the Rails: American Railroad Accidents and Safety, 1828-1965 (2006) excerpt
 Vaughan, Adrian. Obstruction Danger: Significant British Railway Accidents, 1890-1986  (Motorbooks International, 1989). online

External links 

 BBC News: World's worst rail disasters
 

Railway accidents and incidents
Causes of death